The Ultimate Collection is a double-disc compilation album by American singer-songwriter Billy Joel. It was first released by Sony Music Entertainment Japan in December 2000, and subsequently issued in the most of European and Oceanian countries with slightly different track listings (replacing Japanese top-3 charting hit "The Stranger" with live version of "You're My Home").

This career-spanning compilation features some of Joel's early notable compositions and hit singles which were disregarded on his Greatest Hits series, although several hits and fan favorites like "Only the Good Die Young", "Captain Jack", "Vienna", "Scenes from an Italian Restaurant", "Pressure" and "Big Shot" were excluded alternatively. It became a smash hit worldwide, entering top-5 on the charts in many countries, including United Kingdom.

The Ultimate Collection was not issued in the United States, however Legacy Recordings released another similar compilation The Essential in October 2001.

Track listing
All songs written and composed by Billy Joel

Disc one

Disc two

Charts

Weekly charts

Year-end charts

Certifications

Album

Video

References

Billy Joel compilation albums
2000 greatest hits albums